The Second Republic of Uganda existed from 1971 to 1979, when Uganda was ruled by Idi Amin's military dictatorship.

The Ugandan economy was devastated by Idi Amin's policies, including the expulsion of Asians, the nationalisation of businesses and industry, and the expansion of the public sector. The real value of salaries and wages collapsed by 90% in less than a decade. The number of people killed as a result of his regime is unknown; estimates from international observers and human rights groups range from 100,000 to 500,000.

Taking power
From Uganda's independence from Great Britain in 1962 to early 1971, Milton Obote's regime had terrorized, harassed, and tortured people. Frequent food shortages led to food prices experiencing hyper-inflation, with one contributing factor being Obote's persecution of Indian traders. During Obote's regime, flagrant and widespread corruption had emerged. The regime was disliked, particularly in Buganda where people had suffered the most.

By January 1971, Milton Obote, then President of Uganda, was prepared to rid himself of the potential threat posed by Idi Amin. Departing for the 1971 Commonwealth Heads of Government Meeting at Singapore, he relayed orders to loyal Langi officers that Amin and his supporters in the army were to be arrested. Various versions emerged of the way this news was leaked to Amin. Also, the role of the foreign powers in the coup had been debated after the fact. Documents declassified by the British Foreign Office reveal that, contrary to earlier speculations, it was not directly facilitated by Great Britain but benefited from covert support by Israel which saw Idi Amin as an agent to de-stabilise Islamic Sudan.
The documents however unveil an outrightly positive assessment of Amin's personality by the British authorities as well as recommendations of support and the sale of arms to the new regime.

In any case, Amin decided to forestall Obote and strike first. In the early morning hours of 25 January 1971, mechanized army units loyal to him attacked strategic targets in Kampala and the airport at Entebbe, where the first shell fired by a pro-Amin tank commander killed two Roman Catholic priests in the airport waiting room. Amin's troops easily overcame the disorganized opposition to the coup, and Amin almost immediately initiated mass executions of Acholi and Langi troops, whom he believed to be pro-Obote.

The Amin coup was warmly welcomed by most of the people of the Buganda kingdom, which Obote had attempted to dismantle. They seemed willing to forget that their new president, Idi Amin, had been the tool of that military suppression. Amin stated intentions about his government's intent to play a mere "caretaker role" until the country could recover sufficiently for civilian rule. Amin repudiated Obote's non-aligned foreign policy, and his government was quickly recognized by Israel, Britain, and the United States. By contrast, presidents Julius Nyerere of Tanzania, Kenneth Kaunda of Zambia, Jomo Kenyatta of Kenya, and the Organization of African Unity (OAU) initially refused to accept the legitimacy of the new military government. Nyerere, in particular, opposed Amin's regime, and he offered hospitality to the exiled Obote, facilitating his attempts to raise a force and return to power.

Once in power

Amin's military experience, which was virtually his only experience, determined the character of his rule. He renamed Government House "the Command Post", instituted an advisory defence council composed of military commanders, placed military tribunals above the system of civil law, appointed soldiers to top government posts and parastatal agencies, and even informed the newly inducted civilian cabinet ministers that they would be subject to military discipline.

Uganda then became a military dictatorship which was, in effect, governed from a collection of military barracks scattered across the country, where battalion commanders, acting like local warlords, represented the coercive arm of the government. The Ugandan General Service Unit (GSU), an intelligence agency created by the previous government, was disbanded and replaced by the Ugandan State Research Bureau (SRB). SRB headquarters at Nakasero became the scene of torture and executions over the next couple of years.

Despite its outward display of a military chain of command, Amin's government was arguably more consumed with rivalries, regional divisions, and ethnic politics than the Uganda People's Congress (UPC) coalition that it had replaced. The army itself was an arena of lethal competition, in which losers were usually eliminated. Within the officer corps, those trained in Britain opposed those trained in Israel, and both stood against the untrained, who soon eliminated many of the army's most experienced officers. In 1966, well before the Amin era, northerners in the army had assaulted and harassed soldiers from the south. In 1971 and 1972, the Lugbara and Kakwa (Amin's ethnic group) from the West Nile were slaughtering northern Acholi and Langi, who were identified with Obote. Then the Kakwa fought the Lugbara. Amin came to rely on Nubians and on former Anyanya rebels from southern Sudan.

Amin recruited his followers from his own tribe, the Kakwas, along with Sudanese and Nubians. By 1977, these three groups formed 60% of the 22 top generals and 75% of the cabinet. Similarly, Muslims formed 80% and 87.5% of these groups even though they were only 5% of the population. This helps explain why Amin survived eight attempted coups.

The Ugandan army grew from 10,000 to over 25,000 by 1978. Amin's army was largely a mercenary force. Half the soldiers were Sudanese, 26% Congolese, only 24% were Ugandan, mostly Muslim and Kakwa.

On 7 August 1973, Idi Amin decreed Swahili was to be Uganda's official language. 12 out of the 20 districts had chosen this, the other 8 wanted Luganda.

The army, which had been progressively expanded under Obote, was further doubled and redoubled under Amin. Recruitment was largely, but not entirely, in the north. There were periodic purges, when various battalion commanders were viewed as potential problems or became real threats. Each purge provided new opportunities for promotions from the ranks. The commander of the Uganda Air Force, Smuts Guweddeko, had previously worked as a telephone operator; the unofficial executioner for the regime, Major Isaac Maliyamungu, had formerly been a nightwatch officer. By the mid-1970s, only the most trustworthy military units were allowed ammunition, although this prohibition did not prevent a series of mutinies and murders. An attempt by an American journalist, Nicholas Stroh, and his colleague, Robert Siedle, to investigate one of these barracks outbreaks in 1971 at the Simba battalion in Mbarara led to their disappearances and, later, deaths. Several army officers who were suspected of having been involved in the murder of Stroh and Siedle were later appointed to high-ranking positions: Among these were Military Tribunal chairman Juma Butabika, chief technical officer of the airforce Captain Taban, Minister of Transport Juma Sabuni, and Minister for Provincial Administration Ali Fadhul.

Muammar Gaddafi and the Soviet Union

Amin never forgot the source of his power. He spent much of his time rewarding, promoting, and manipulating the officers and soldiers of the Ugandan army. Financing his ever-increasing military expenditures was a continuing concern. Early in 1972, he reversed foreign policy — never a major issue for Amin — to secure financial and military aid from Muammar Gaddafi of Libya. Amin expelled the remaining Israeli advisers, to whom he was much indebted, and became anti-Israel. To induce foreign aid from Saudi Arabia, he rediscovered his previously neglected Islamic heritage. He also commissioned the construction of a great mosque on Kampala Hill in the capital city, but it was never completed during his rule because much of the money intended for it was embezzled. In 2008 Amin's dream of building one of Africa's largest mosques came true, and construction was finally completed more than 30 years after it initially began.

Following his foreign policy reversal in 1972, the Soviet Union became Amin's largest arms supplier.

East Germany helped to build Amin's secret police. During the Tanzanian invasion in 1979, East Germany attempted to remove evidence about its involvement.

Expulsion of Asians and nationalisations

In August 1972, Amin gave most of Uganda's 80,000 Asians, most of whom were the descendants of indentured servants and other laborers from India, 90 days to leave the country, and seized their property, homes and businesses. At the time of the expulsion, there were approximately 80,000 individuals of South Asian descent in Uganda, of whom 23,000 had had their applications for citizenship both processed and accepted. Although the latter were ultimately exempted from the expulsion, many chose to leave voluntarily. The expulsion took place against a backdrop of Indophobia in Uganda, with Amin accusing a minority of the Asian population of disloyalty, non-integration and commercial malpractice, claims Indian leaders disputed. Amin defended the expulsion by arguing that he was giving Uganda back to the ethnic Ugandan.

Many of the expellees were citizens of the United Kingdom and Colonies and 27,200 subsequently emigrated to the United Kingdom. Of the other refugees who were accounted for, 6,000 went to Canada, 4,500 refugees ended up in India and 2,500 went to nearby Kenya. In total, some 5,655 firms, ranches, farms, and agricultural estates were reallocated, along with cars, homes and other household goods. Although Amin proclaimed that the "common man" was the beneficiary of this drastic act — which proved immensely popular in Uganda and most of Africa — it was actually the Ugandan army that emerged with the houses, cars, and businesses of the departing Asian minority. This expropriation of foreign property proved disastrous for the already declining economy. With the economy now run by Ugandan army officers and supporters (many of whom had no experience in how to run a business), all of the local businesses and stores were soon run into the ground from mismanagement and abuse of power, cement factories at Tororo and Fort Portal collapsed from lack of maintenance and neglect, and sugar production ground to a halt as unmaintained machinery jammed permanently.

Uganda's export crops were sold by government parastatals, but most of the foreign currency they earned went for purchasing weapons and imports for the army. The most famous example of this was the so-called "whisky runs" to Stansted Airport in England, where planeloads of expensive Scotch whisky, transistor radios, gold Rolex wristwatches, and other luxury items were purchased for Amin to distribute among his officers and soldiers. Amin later justified his rewarding and doting on the Ugandan army by quoting an old African proverb, which summed up to Amin's treatment of his army: "A dog with a bone in its mouth can't bite."

With the Ugandan economy faltering, the rural African producers and farmers, particularly of coffee, turned to smuggling, especially to Kenya. The smuggling problem became an obsession with Amin; toward the end of his rule, he appointed his mercenary and political adviser, the former British citizen Bob Astles, to take all necessary steps to eliminate the problem. These steps included orders to the Ugandan police and army to shoot smugglers on sight.

Terror

Another near-obsession for Amin was the threat of a counter-attack by former president Obote. Shortly after the expulsion of Asians in 1972, Obote did launch such an attempt across the Tanzanian border into south-western Uganda. His small army contingent in twenty-seven trucks set out to capture the southern Ugandan military post at Masaka but instead settled down to await a general uprising against Amin, which did not occur. A planned seizure of the airport at Entebbe by soldiers in an allegedly hijacked East African Airways passenger aircraft was aborted when Obote's pilot blew out the aircraft's tires and it remained in Tanzania. Amin was able to mobilize his more reliable Malire Mechanical Regiment and expel the invaders.

Although jubilant at his success, Amin realized that Obote, with Nyerere's aid, might try again. He had the SRB and the newly formed Public Safety Unit (PSU) redouble their efforts to uncover subversives and other imagined enemies of the state. General fear and insecurity became a way of life for the populace, as thousands of people disappeared. In an ominous twist, people sometimes learned by listening to the radio that they were "about to disappear."

State terrorism was evidenced in a series of spectacular incidents; for example, High Court Judge Benedicto Kiwanuka, former head of government and leader of the banned DP, was seized directly from his courtroom. Like many other victims, he was forced to remove his shoes and then bundled into the trunk of a car, never to be seen alive again. Whether calculated or not, the symbolism of a pair of shoes by the roadside to mark the passing of a human life was a bizarre yet piercing form of state terrorism.

Environment
During the eight years under Amin's rule, the Ugandan environment and ecological system was subjected to abuse and destruction by widespread poaching and deforesting committed by both smugglers and Uganda Army soldiers. Amin encouraged officers to engage in poaching and ivory trade, using these as benefits provided to troops in order to keep them loyal. Soldiers frequently engaged in poaching in national parks and game reserves. In course of the Uganda–Tanzania War, Uganda Army troops and Tanzanian soldiers hunted for food and profit across Uganda, causing further environmental damage. It is reported that Uganda lost 75% of its elephants, 98% of its rhinos, 80% of its crocodiles, 80% of its lions and leopards, in addition to numerous species of birds.

Palestinian hijackers of Air France Flight 139

Amin attempted to establish ties with the Popular Front for the Liberation of Palestine – External Operations in June 1976, when he offered the Palestinian hijackers of an Air France flight from Tel Aviv a protected base at the old airport at Entebbe, from which to press their demands in exchange for the release of Israeli hostages. The dramatic rescue of the hostages by Israeli commandos was a severe blow to Amin. Humiliated, he retaliated against an elderly hostage—75-year-old Dora Bloch— who was hospitalized in poor health at the time of the raid and was left behind. Bloch was kidnapped from her hospital bed and killed on Amin's orders, along with the entire civilian staff of Entebbe airport.

Government

Amin's government, conducted by often erratic personal proclamation, continued on. Because he was illiterate his entire life — a disability shared with most of his fellow military officers and soldiers — Amin relayed orders and policy decisions orally by telephone, over the radio, and in long rambling speeches to which civil servants were told to pay close attention. The bureaucracy soon became paralysed as government administrators feared to make what might prove to be a wrong decision that would displease or anger Amin in the slightest which would result in their immediate arrest and imprisonment or summary execution.

Shortly after Amin seized power, the Minister of Defence demanded, and was given, command of the Ministry of Education office building, but then the decision was reversed by Amin for no clear reason. Important education files were lost during their transfer back and forth by wheelbarrow. In many respects, Amin's government in the 1970s resembled the governments of nineteenth-century African monarchs, with the same problems of enforcing orders at a distance, controlling rival factions at court, and rewarding loyal followers with plunder. Indeed, Amin's regime was possibly less efficient than those of the pre-colonial monarchs.

Religious conflict was another characteristic of the Amin regime that had its origins in the nineteenth century. After rediscovering his Islamic allegiance in the effort to gain foreign aid from Libya and Saudi Arabia, Amin began to pay more attention to the formerly deprived Muslims in Uganda, a move which turned out to be a mixed blessing for them. Muslims began to do well in what economic opportunities yet remained, the more so if they had relatives in the army. Construction work began on Kibuli Hill, the site of Kampala's most prominent mosque. Many Ugandan Muslims with a sense of history believed that the Muslim defeat by Christians in 1889 was finally being redressed. Christians, in turn, perceived that they were under siege as a religious group; it was clear that Amin viewed the churches as potential centres of opposition. A number of priests and ministers disappeared in the course of the 1970s, but the matter reached a climax with the formal protest against army terrorism in 1977 by Church of Uganda ministers, led by Archbishop Janani Luwum. Although Luwum's body was subsequently recovered from a clumsily contrived "car accident", subsequent investigations revealed that Luwum had been shot dead.

This latest in a long line of atrocities was greeted with international condemnation, but apart from the continued trade boycott initiated by the United States in July 1978, verbal condemnation was not accompanied by action. In September 1978, Amin banned nearly all Christian Church activities for their subversiveness. By early 1978 Amin's circle of close associates had shrunk significantly — the result of defections and executions. Because of his violent temper as well as his erratic and unpredictable behaviour, it was increasingly risky to be too close to Amin, as his vice president and formerly trusted associate, General Mustafa Adrisi, discovered. When Adrisi was injured in a suspicious auto accident, troops loyal to him became restive. The once reliable Malire Mechanized Regiment mutinied, as did other units.

In October 1978, Amin sent troops still loyal to him against the mutineers, some of whom fled across the Tanzanian border. Amin then claimed that Tanzanian President Nyerere, his perennial enemy, had been at the root of his troubles. Amin accused Nyerere of waging war against Uganda, and, hoping to divert attention from his internal troubles and rally Uganda against the foreign adversary, Amin invaded Tanzanian territory and formally annexed a section across the Kagera River boundary on 1 November 1978.

Uganda–Tanzania War

Declaring a formal state of war against Uganda, Nyerere mobilized his citizen army reserves and counter-attacked, joined by Ugandan exiles united as the Uganda National Liberation Army (UNLA). The Ugandan Army retreated steadily, expending much of its energy by looting along the way. Libya's Gaddafi sent 3,000 troops to aid Amin, but the Libyans soon found themselves on the front line, while behind them Ugandan Army units were using supply trucks to carry their newly plundered wealth in the opposite direction. Tanzania and the UNLA took Kampala on 11 April 1979, and Amin fled by air, first to Libya and later to a permanent exile at Jeddah, Saudi Arabia. Though pro-Amin forces were left scattered and disjointed by the seizure of the capital, combat operations in the country continued until 3 June, when Tanzanian forces reached the Sudanese border and eliminated the last resistance.

See also
Uganda–Tanzania War
The Last King of Scotland, a book and film about living close to Amin

References

Works cited

Further reading

 
 
Life Under Idi Amin: The Story of Theresa Nanziri Bukenya
 - Uganda

Idi Amin
Totalitarian states
History of Uganda by period
Uganda, Amin
Uganda